Mossy Murphy is a retired Irish sportsperson.  He played hurling with his local club Mullinavat and was a member of the Kilkenny senior inter-county team in the 1970s.  With Kilkenny, Murphy won All-Ireland and Leinster titles in 1972.

References

Living people
Kilkenny inter-county hurlers
All-Ireland Senior Hurling Championship winners
Year of birth missing (living people)
Mullinavat hurlers